Lewis Henry Clarke Stevenson (born 1 June 1984) is an Irish rugby union footballer. He previously played for the Ulster, Exeter Chiefs and Harlequins. He currently plays for Connacht in the Pro14 as a lock.

Life and career
Stevenson grew up outside a small village called Ballynure, approximately 12 miles from Belfast. He attended Ballynure Primary school until attending Ballyclare High School. From year 8, Stevenson then started playing rugby. Stevenson then made the Medallion XV rugby squad as a replacement, despite being a year too young to normally play. That year the team reached the semi-final where they lost to Regent House (the eventual champions). The next year he played again for the Medallion XV where he and fellow team members won the Medallion Plate that year against Larne Grammar.

Notes

1984 births
Living people
Irish rugby union players
Ulster Rugby players
Exeter Chiefs players
Harlequin F.C. players
Connacht Rugby players
Ireland Wolfhounds international rugby union players
Rugby union locks
Rugby union players from County Antrim